Myoxocephalus polyacanthocephalus, the great sculpin, s a species of marine ray-finned fish belonging to the family Cottidae, the typical sculpins.  It is found in the North Pacific Ocean from the Bering Sea and the Aleutian Islands, and extends from Hokkaido and the Kamchatka Peninsula to the Puget Sound, Washington.
It is the largest member of the genus Myoxocephalus and the second most common in the Bering Sea. It can grow to a size of 80 cm and 9 kg weight.

Myoxocephalus polyacanthocephalus is a predatory fish. It has acellular bones.

References

External links
 Great Sculpin (Myoxocephalus polyacanthocephalus) at the Encyclopedia of Life

polyacanthocephalus
Fish described in 1814
Taxa named by Peter Simon Pallas